The DKW F1 was a small car produced by DKW (part of the Auto Union) between 1931 and 1932. It was launched at the Berlin Motor Show in February 1931. 

The F1 was the first of a line of front wheel drive DKWs assembled at the manufacturer’s Zwickau plant, while the larger rear wheel drive DKWs continued to be built in the Berlin district of Spandau.

Origins
In October 1930 the company’s Danish born chief, Jørgen Skafte Rasmussen, mandated his development team at the Zwickau plant to design a small car that could be powered by a DKW motorbike engine and built at the plant. Rasmussen also specified front wheel drive, independent suspension and a chassis with a very low centre of gravity. The car should be popular and cheap.

Development and launch
After just six weeks the team designed a 2 + 1 seater roadster which weighed 450 kg with the 25 litre fuel tank full, and which offered exceptional driving qualities. In addition to undertaking the design work, the team had already prepared three test vehicles. This would be the car which appeared at the Berlin Motor Show in February 1931 with an open topped steel body and a 494 cc two-cylinder two-stroke engine. By the time, later in the same year, that cars were available for sale the design had acquired a stronger drive shaft mechanism and a timber frame body coated in imitation leather. Light weight and low cost remained priorities. The car cost approximately 1700 RM.

In addition to the 494 cc engine, a slightly larger 584 cc was offered, providing 11 kW (15 PS) of advertised maximum power. In the event, no DKW F1 “Type F500” fitted with the smaller engine was ever sold. The approximately 4,000 F1s that were sold all came powered by the larger “Type 600” engine. Nevertheless, sales brochures dating from the summer of 1932 still included both engine sizes, which enabled the manufacturer to advertise an eye catchingly low starting price for the car.

Body types
As was normal at this time even for very small cars, a range of body types was available. In addition to the roadster, open topped sedan/saloon and saloon bodied cars, buyers could also specify various sports style bodies including a single seater featuring a then fashionable “boat-deck” style rear end.

At an enthusiasts’ meeting at the Nürburgring in the 1970s it was reported that a single seater sports bodied DKW F1 recorded a top speed of 120 km/h (75 mph).

Manufacturing logistics
The F1, like subsequent front wheel drive DKWs till 1942, was assembled at the company's Zwickau plant which Rasmussen had acquired for the business in 1928 or 1929 by becoming a majority shareholder in Audi-Werke AG. The F1's body was assembled at the Spandau factory which had been acquired by Rasmussen in 1924 with the purchase of SB-Automobil-GmbH.  The timber bodies were then transported the approximately 300 kilometers (190 miles) to Zwickau by train.

The Zschopau plant was close to Zwickau and had originated in 1906 as an armaments factory established by Berthold Ruppe. Its inclusion in what would become the Auto Union dated from Rasmussen's work with Ruppe's son, Hugo, in establishing at the plant the "Zschopauer Motorenwerke J. S. Rasmussen AG". By 1931 this plant had become home to the largest manufacturer of motorcycles in the world, and it was Zschopau that produced the two stroke engines for the DKW F1 and its successors.

Commercial
Approximately 4,000 DKW F1s were sold between 1931 and 1932 which would have equated to a market share of approximately 8% in a depressed passenger car market. However, the DKW F1’s larger significance arose both because it pioneered volume production for front-wheel drive cars and because it was the first in a line of inexpensive light weight DKWs, from the F1 to the F8, which secured DKW’s position as the country’s most successful manufacturer of small cars in the 1930s and second place in the country’s sales charts (beaten to the top position only by Opel) every year between 1933 and 1938.

Sources and further reading

 Audi (publisher): Das Rad der Zeit. 2000.
 
 Rauch, Siegfried: DKW – Die Geschichte einer Weltmarke. Motorbuch Verlag, Stuttgart 1988.
 Staatsarchiv Chemnitz (publisher): In Fahrt Autos aus Sachsen. Mitteldeutscher Verlag, Halle, Germany, 2005.
 Various authors: Von 0 auf 100. Hundert Jahre Autoland Sachsen. Chemnitzer Verlag, 2001/2003.

This entry is based on information from the German Wikipedia DKW F1 article.

Roadsters
1930s cars
Cars introduced in 1931
F1
Compact cars
Front-wheel-drive vehicles